The Ministry of Defence (MINDEF; ;) is a ministry of the Government of Singapore responsible for overseeing the national defence of Singapore.

History

MINDEF, together with the Ministry of Home Affairs, was created on 11 August 1970 by splitting up the then Ministry of Interior and Defence.

Responsibilities
MINDEF's mission is to "enhance Singapore's peace and security through deterrence and diplomacy, and should these fail, to secure a swift and decisive victory over the aggressor."

It has a policy of Total Defence which consists of Military Defence, Civil Defence, Economic Defence, Social Defence, Psychological Defence and Digital Defence involving the people, public and private sectors of the country.

Organisational structure

MINDEF oversees a single statutory board, the Defence Science and Technology Agency. The Singapore Armed Forces, which is in charge of the Republic of Singapore Air Force (RSAF), the Republic of Singapore Navy (RSN), the Singapore Army and the Digital and Intelligence Service (DIS) is a military component of the Ministry of Defence (MINDEF).

Statutory boards

 Defence Science and Technology Agency
 Singapore Armed Forces

Ministers
The Ministry is headed by the Minister for Defence, who is appointed as part of the Cabinet of Singapore. The incumbent minister is Ng Eng Hen from the People's Action Party.

See also
 Government of Singapore
 Ministry of Home Affairs

References

External links

Official website
Singapore Government Directory Interactive — Ministry of Defence
https://www.mindef.gov.sg/oms/dam/publications/ebooks/more_ebooks/ds21.pdf

Military of Singapore
Defence, Ministry of
Singapore
Ministries established in 1970
1970 establishments in Singapore